is a city located in Aichi Prefecture, Japan.

Overview
The name of the city means "south of the river", referring to the Kiso River.

Geography
Kōnan is located in the northern part of the Nōbi Plain, on the southern bank of the Kiso River. The landform is generally a flat, fertile alluvial fan.

Climate
The city has a climate characterized by hot and humid summers, and relatively mild winters (Köppen climate classification Cfa).

Demographics
Per Japanese census data, the population of Kōnan has increased steadily over the past 70 years.

Surrounding municipalities
Aichi Prefecture
Ichinomiya
Komaki
Iwakura
Fusō
Ōguchi
Gifu Prefecture
Kakamigahara

History
The area of Kōnan is located in ancient Owari Province and was largely part of the holdings of Owari Domain under the Edo period Tokugawa Shogunate. After the establishment of the modern municipalities system in the early Meiji period, the area was organized into villages within Niwa District, Aichi Prefecture. The area was noted for sericulture during this period. The village of Koori became the town of Hotei on November 26, 1894. Hotei and the town of Kochino, together with the town of Miyata and village of Kusai (both from Haguri District) merged on June 1, 1954 to form the city of Kōnan. The Kōnan reached 100,000 people.

Government
Kōnan has a mayor-council form of government with a directly elected mayor and a unicameral city legislature of 22 members. The city contributes one member to the Aichi Prefectural Assembly.  In terms of national politics, the city is part of Aichi District 10 of the lower house of the Diet of Japan.

Economy
Kōnan is a local commercial center and a center for transshipment and light manufacturing. Due to its proximity to the Nagoya metropolis, it is increasing becoming a commuter community
Shopping mall
VIA MALL Kounan

Education
Kōnan has ten public elementary schools and five public junior high schools operated by the city government, and three public high schools operated by the Aichi Prefectural Board of Education. There is also one private junior high school and one private high school. The Aichi Konan College, a two-year junior college is also located in Kōnan.

Transportation

Railways

Conventional lines
Meitetsu
Inuyama Line：-  –  -

Roads

Japan National Route

Local attractions
Park
Flower Park Konan
Suitopia Konan

Historic site
Koori Castle
Mandaradera-ji temple
Kannon-ji temple -  bodaiji of Maeno Nagayasu
Hotei Daibutsu
Somoto Futagoyama kofun
Aigi Bridge

Culture

Festival
Kitano Tenjin Festival
Fuji Matsuri

Notable people from Kōnan 
Kenji Horikawa, anime producer
Haruna Ono, musician, frontwoman of SCANDAL
Seira Nakayama, Japanese sabre fencer
Yukari Nakano, figure skater

References

External links

  
Transition

 
Cities in Aichi Prefecture